 
Long Beach Fire Department may refer to:

 Long Beach Fire Department (California) - The fire department for Long Beach, California. 
 Long Beach Fire Department (New York) - The fire department for Long Beach, New York.